The Willys–Overland Block is a historic commercial and industrial block at 151-157 Chestnut and 10-20 Winter Streets in downtown Springfield, Massachusetts.  Built in 1916, it is a surviving reminder of Springfield early history in the manufacture and sale of automobile, housing the sales showroom and service center for the Willys–Overland Company.  It was listed on the National Register of Historic Places on February 24, 1983.

Description and history
The Willys–Overland Block is located in downtown Springfield, at the northeast corner of Chestnut and Winter Streets.  It is a four-story masonry structure, finished in brick with stone trim.  The building's external appearance is one more typically associated with commercial buildings, disguising its original use as a more industrial facility.  Its bays are divided into groups of four bays on the upper floors, with sections that would roughly correspond to retail storefronts on the ground floor; these grouping are separated by buttress-like projections with medallions at the top.  The building's original uses included an automotive showroom and sales facility, and a 1000-car garage and service facility.

The block was built in 1916 for the Willys–Overland Company.  It sold and serviced its automobiles here before and after the company became Jeep in the 1960s. Located in the three blocks surrounding the Apremont Triangle Historic District and the famed Hotel Kimball, Willys–Overland was among numerous early and mid-twentieth century automobile sellers in the neighborhood. Others included Rolls-Royce and Pontiac.

In 2011, the Willys–Overland Block was home to three separate churches, a parking garage, and an Hispanic radio station.  In 2015, the Springfield City Council established a historic district around the block, after the building owner sought its demolition rather than effect repairs incurred by a gas explosion in 2012.

See also
Willys–Overland Building, St. Louis, Missouri, also designed by Mills, Rhines, Bellman & Nordhoff
National Register of Historic Places listings in Springfield, Massachusetts
National Register of Historic Places listings in Hampden County, Massachusetts

References

Commercial blocks on the National Register of Historic Places in Massachusetts
Buildings and structures in Springfield, Massachusetts
History of Springfield, Massachusetts
National Register of Historic Places in Springfield, Massachusetts